Cristina María Saralegui de Ávila (born January 29, 1948) is a Cuban-born American journalist, television personality, actress and talk show host of the Spanish-language eponymous show, . Before her television career, she worked for ten years as editor-in-chief of the Spanish-language version of Cosmopolitan magazine distributed throughout Latin America.

Early life and family
Cristina María Saralegui Santamarina was born in Miramar, Havana, Cuba, to Francisco Rene Saralegui Álvarez, Jr. and María Cristina de las Nieves Santamarina Díaz. She is the eldest of five, she had two sisters Vicky and María Eugenia, as well as two brothers, Patxi and Iñaki. Saralegui is of Basque Country descent with all four grandparents having origins in Spain. Her paternal grandfather Francisco Saralegui Arizubieta was a Basque from Lizarza and her paternal grandmother Amalia "Amalita" Álvarez Cuesta, an Asturian from Gijon; her maternal grandfather was José Santamarina Iviricu, and her maternal grandmother Águeda Díaz.

In 1960, following the Cuban Revolution, Saralegui and her family fled to Miami, Florida, United States, and settled on Key Biscayne.

Journalism career
After graduating from the Academy of the Assumption in 1966, Saralegui enrolled at the University of Miami. In 1973, she began an internship at the magazine Vanidades. This allowed her to improve her written Spanish to the level of her spoken language. By 1979, Saralegui was editor of the Spanish version of Cosmopolitan magazine. She continued in this role through most of the 1980s.

El Show de Cristina

In 1989, Saralegui transferred her journalistic success to television, by launching the Miami-based Spanish-language talk show, El Show de Cristina (The Cristina Show) on Univisión. She concluded each episode with a double thumbs-up salute and the Cuban expression "Pa'lante, pa'lante, pa'tras ni pa' coger impulso", ("Forward, forward; don't step back, not even to gain momentum"...could also be understood as "to get a running start".)

Prominent guests included Shakira, Paulina Rubio, Don Francisco, the former members of Menudo, Fernando Colunga, Selena, Lucero, Celia Cruz, Camilo Sesto, Thalía, Isabel Pantoja, Julio Iglesias, Jaci Velasquez, Alejandro Fernández, Enrique Iglesias, Pitbull, Sussan Taunton, Jorge Ramos, Gloria Estefan and her husband Emilio Estefan, Jr., Gloria Trevi, Chayanne, Sebastian Rulli, Xuxa, Ricky Martin, RBD, Niurka, Noelia, Anaís, George Lopez, Jennifer Lopez, Adela Noriega,  Grecia Colmenares, Alexandra Cheron, Amelia Vega, Angélica Vale, Angélica María, and Susana Gonzalez.

During the program recorded on Monday, October 25, 2010, Cristina reviewed her career and the program's more memorable episodes and guests.

Saragelui's talk show last aired on November 1, 2010 after 21 years. Hosted by Mexican actor, Fernando Colunga, Cristina was celebrated by her colleagues Daniela Romo, Cesar Evora, Thalia, Shakira, Gloria Estefan, Emilio Estefan, Angelica Maria, Carmen Salinas, Don Francisco, Jorge Ramos, and others. Some of her Univision colleagues were in the audience from where they interacted with Cristina herself, sharing anecdotes and messages of hope and admiration.

Saralegui went on to publish her own magazine, Cristina: La Revista (Cristina: The Magazine) and several books. She is referred to as "the Spanish-Cuban Oprah".

In 1992, Saralegui had an English-language syndicated talk show, Cristina, which was cancelled after half a season.

The song Somos El Mundo premiered during Saralegui's show, with an appeal to help the Haiti relief effort. It was translated by Gloria Estefan, produced by her husband Emilio Estefan and approved by Quincy Jones.

During her last show on Univision, Saralegui said,

Cristina no se retira, jamas dejaría esto... aquí hay Cristina y ¡para rato! (Cristina does not retire, I would never leave this... there is (still) Cristina and for a (good) while!).

Saralegui remained under contract with Univision until December 31, 2010. It was discussed that she might continue as a collaborator, for special programs and interviews, and that a new Cristina show would debut in March, 2011, but this did not happen.

Career after Univision (WAPA-TV and WLII-DT)
The Spanish-language Network Azteca América presented a one-hour special, "Cristina Breaks the Silence" where, for the first time since her retirement from Univision, Saralegui was interviewed on television. The interview, hosted by Frank Cairo, a former producer and creator of the Cristina show, touched on many issues, from guests who were considered "difficult", to the unexpected announcement from the executives of Univision that her show was being canceled, as well as reactions, emotions, and responses to the news.

It was announced on May 17, 2011 that Telemundo had hired Cristina for a weekly variety show, Pa' lante con Cristina (Forward with Cristina), beginning in the fall of 2011. The program debuted on Telemundo on May 31 of that year, hosting a one-hour special retrospective featuring the stars of the just-completed telenovela La Reina del Sur.

On May 31, 2012, it was announced that Pa' lante con Cristina would end its run and will not be renewed for another season.

In 2012, Saralegui began Cristina Radio on Sirius XM.

In June 2012, Saralegui endorsed President Barack Obama for a second term, marking her first political endorsement ever.

Television

Web presence
Currently, Saralegui has joined with AARP to help raise awareness, within the Latino community, about the benefits AARP has to offer. They have created ¡Amigos Live!, an online interactive video.

Personal life
She is divorced from her first husband, Tony, with whom she has a daughter Cristina Amelia. She has been married to Marcos Ávila since 1982, a former member of the Miami Sound Machine, and from this marriage she has a stepdaughter, Stephanie. Together they have one child, son Jon Marcos.

References

External links
Cristina's Facebook Page
University of Miami famous alumni
Cristina Saralegui's Website

American television actresses
American women journalists
American television talk show hosts
Cuban emigrants to the United States
Cuban journalists
Cuban women journalists
Exiles of the Cuban Revolution in the United States
Hispanic and Latino American people in television
University of Miami alumni
Actresses from Miami
Cuban people of Basque descent
American entertainers of Cuban descent
1948 births
Living people
Cuban people of Spanish descent
Cuban women writers
American people of Basque descent
American people of Asturian descent
21st-century American women
American editors
American women editors
American magazine editors
Women magazine editors